This article discusses the specific topic of reference genes. For a more general list of housekeeping genes see housekeeping genes 

Reference genes are expressed in all cells of an organism under normal and patho-physiological conditions. Although some housekeeping genes (such as LDHA, NONO, PGK1 and PPIH,)  are expressed at relatively constant levels in most non-pathological situations, other housekeeping genes may vary depending on experimental conditions.
Although the terms "housekeeping gene" and "reference gene" are used somewhat interchangeably, caution must be used in selecting genes for reference purposes. Suitable reference genes must be stably expressed in the specific experimental condition or tissue of interest. Recently a web-based database of human and mouse cell specific reference genes/transcripts, named Housekeeping and Reference Transcript Atlas (HRT Atlas), was developed to offer reliable reference genes/transcripts for RT-qPCR data normalization.

This is a list of housekeeping genes and transcripts  stably expressed across 52 human tissues and cell types that may be used for reference purposes after empirical validation:

HRT Atlas allows searching of a complete list of reliable candidate reference genes and transcripts for RT-qPCR normalization in more than 120 human and mouse tissues or cell types. The database also offers some empirically validated primers and predicted modifiers (disease and small molecules) of the expression of these reference genes.

The following represent genes that should probably not be used for reference purposes: GUSB, RPLP0, TFRC, GAPDH, HSP90, and β-actin.  Although they were once considered as "housekeeping genes," recent data suggests that they are not as reliable as once thought.

See also

Gene
Genevestigator
Genome
Inducible gene
Minimal genome
Essential proteins in protein complexes
Spatiotemporal gene expression

References

Genes
Human genes